Gururaj is an Indian actor who predominantly works in Kannada cinema. He is known for his 2009 film Gilli, the remake of Tamil-Telugu film 7G Rainbow Colony.

Career 
He made his debut as a story writer for his father Jaggesh's Makeup (2002). He made his debut as lead actor with Gilli  (2009) before starring in Guru (2012) under his father's direction.

Filmography

References

External links
 

Living people
Male actors in Kannada cinema
Male actors from Bangalore
Indian male film actors
21st-century Indian male actors
Year of birth missing (living people)